The 1970 World Rowing Championships was the 3rd World Rowing Championships. It was held in 1970 at the Royal Canadian Henley Rowing Course in St. Catharines, Ontario, Canada. The competition involved seven events. Prior to the 4th World Rowing Championships in 1974, only men competed.

Background
The International Rowing Federation (FISA) held a congress in conjunction with the 1967 European Rowing Championships in Vichy, France. At that congress, it was decided that the 1970 World Championships would be held outside of Europe, and that Canada was likely be chosen as host.

Medal summary

Medalists at the 1970 World Rowing Championships:

Men's events

Event codes

Medal table

Finals

+ 7 boat final following protest in semi finals from Australia

References

World Rowing Championships
World Rowing Championships
World Rowing Championships
1970 World Rowing Championships
Rowing competitions in Canada
World Rowing Championships
World Rowing Championships